Isabel "Belle" Geraldine Washington Powell (May 23, 1908 – May 1, 2007) was a dancer, showgirl, and actress during the Harlem Renaissance. She was the first wife of Adam Clayton Powell Jr., and after their divorce, she went on to work in the Harlem public school system.

Biography
Isabel Washington was born May 23, 1908, in Savannah, Georgia. Raised in Savannah, she lived with her parents, Harriet (Hattie) Walker Ward Washington, a dancer, and Robert T. Washington, a postal worker, as well as her four brothers and four sisters. After their mother died, she and her older sister Fredi were sent to school at St. Elizabeth's Convent in Cornwell Heights, Pennsylvania. Powell later moved to New York to live with Fredi, who later became well-known as an actress.

Following her sister into show business, Washington became a dancer and showgirl at various New York nightclubs, as well as acting on the Broadway stage. In 1929 she played the “other woman” in Bessie Smith’s only film, St. Louis Blues.

Washington's first marriage was to photographer Preston Webster. They had one son together, Preston, Jr (later Preston Powell).

While dancing at the Cotton Club, Washington met Reverend Adam Clayton Powell Jr. The two were married in 1933 at the Abyssinian Baptist Church, where Adam Clayton Powell Sr. served as minister. Powell's father objected to the marriage, as Washington was Catholic, but she converted and the wedding drew 3,000 spectators.

Isabel Powell assisted her husband in his early career, during which he was elected to New York City Council, became the senior minister at the Abyssinian Baptist Church, and in 1944, he was elected to the United States House of Representatives. In 1937 the couple purchased a house in Oak Bluffs, Massachusetts, an African-American community in Martha's Vineyard. They were married from 1933 until 1945, when Powell, a Baptist minister, left her for his second wife.

After her divorce, Powell became a special education teacher. She divided her time between Harlem and Martha's Vineyard. Powell died on May 1, 2007, in Harlem, New York.

References

Further reading
 Adam's Belle: A Memoir of Love Without Bounds, by Isabel Washington Powell and Joyce Burnett,

External links

1908 births
2007 deaths
20th-century African-American people
20th-century African-American women
20th-century American people
21st-century African-American people
21st-century African-American women
African-American actresses
American actresses
Baptists from New York (state)
Converts to Baptist denominations from Roman Catholicism
Harlem Renaissance